Valentine Augustus Browne, 4th Earl of Kenmare KP, PC (16 May 1825 – 9 February 1905), styled Viscount Castlerosse from 1853 to 1871, was a British courtier and Liberal politician. He held office in every Whig or Liberal administration between 1856 and 1886, notably as Lord Chamberlain of the Household under William Gladstone between 1880 and 1885 and in 1886.

Background
Browne was the son of Thomas Browne, 3rd Earl of Kenmare, by his wife Catherine O'Callaghan, daughter of Edmund O'Callaghan, of Kilgory, County Clare. He became known by the courtesy title Viscount Castlerosse when his father succeeded in the earldom of Kenmare in 1853. The Kenmare estate which Browne inherited from his father amounted, in the 1870s, to over 117,000 acres, predominantly in County Kerry.

In 1872, the 4th Earl of Kenmare decided to build an Elizabethan-Revival manor house, called Killarney House, on a hillside with extensive views of Lough Leane. The cost was well over £100,000. This house was the replacement for Kenmare House, built in 1726, as the seat of the Earls of Kenmare. The old house was demolished.

Political career

Lord Castlerosse was appointed High Sheriff of Kerry for 1851. The following year he was returned to parliament as one of two representatives for Kerry. In 1856 he was appointed Comptroller of the Household under Lord Palmerston, a post he held until the government fell in 1858.

He was sworn of the Privy Council in February 1857. When Palmerston resumed office in 1859, Castlerosse became Vice-Chamberlain of the Household, which he remained until 1866, the last year under the premiership of Lord Russell. He again became Vice-Chamberlain of the Household in 1868 in William Gladstone's first administration.

In December 1871 he succeeded his father in the earldom and took his seat in the House of Lords. He consequently resigned as Vice-Chamberlain (a post normally held by a commoner) and in February 1872 he was appointed a Lord-in-waiting, i. e. a government whip in the House of Lords. In June of that year he was made a Knight of the Order of St Patrick. The Liberal government fell in 1874. Gladstone returned as prime minister in 1880, when Lord Kenmare was appointed Lord Chamberlain of the Household.

He held this office until 1885 and again briefly in Gladstone's third administration between February and July 1886. Apart from his political career he was also Lord-Lieutenant of Kerry between 1866 and 1905.

Family
Lord Kenmare married Gertrude Thynne, daughter of Reverend Lord Charles Thynne, Canon of Canterbury, and granddaughter of Thomas Thynne, 2nd Marquess of Bath, on 28 April 1858. They had three children:

Lady Margaret Theodora May Catherine Browne (d. 1940), married G.C. Douglas in 1889, died childless.
Valentine Charles Browne, 5th Earl of Kenmare (1860–1941)
Hon. Cecil Augustine Browne (1864–1887)

Death
Lord Kenmare died on 9 February 1905, aged 79, and was succeeded in the earldom by his eldest and only surviving son, Valentine. The Countess of Kenmare died in February 1913.

References

External links

1825 births
1905 deaths
Knights of St Patrick
Liberal Party (UK) Lords-in-Waiting
Lord-Lieutenants of Kerry
Members of the Privy Council of the United Kingdom
Castlerosse, Valentine Browne, Viscount
Castlerosse, Valentine Browne, Viscount
Castlerosse, Valentine Browne, Viscount
Castlerosse, Valentine Browne, Viscount
Castlerosse, Valentine Browne, Viscount
Castlerosse, Valentine Browne, Viscount
UK MPs who inherited peerages
High Sheriffs of Kerry
Kenmare, Valentine Browne, 8th Viscount
4
Valentine